Arminghall is a village and former civil parish, now in the parish of Caistor St Edmund and Bixley, in the South Norfolk district, in the county of Norfolk, England. Most of the houses in the village are located close to the church, which lies just west of the B1332 road from Norwich to Poringland. Syfer Technology, an electronic components manufacturer, is based at Old Stoke Road, close to the River Tas. In 1931 the parish had a population of 108.

History 
The name 'Arminghall' means 'Nook of land of Ambre's/Eanmaer's people'. The exact form of the personal name is uncertain. Arminghall was recorded in the Domesday Book as Hameringahala. On 1 April 1935 the parish was abolished and merged with Bixley. In 2019 Bixley parish was abolished to form "Caistor St Edmund and Bixley".

Arminghall Henge
In 1929 a prehistoric timber circle and henge monument site was discovered 1½ miles (2½ km) northwest of Arminghall village by Gilbert Insall VC who had been taking air photos of the area in search of new archaeological sites. Whilst flying at around 2,000 feet (600 m) he noticed cropmarks of a circular enclosure made of two concentric rings with a horseshoe of eight pit-like markings within it. The entire site was around 75 m in diameter. The site was visited a week later by O.G.S. Crawford, who pronounced it to be the Norwich Woodhenge but it was not until 1935 that it was first excavated, by Grahame Clark. His work established that two circular rings were ditches, the outer one 1.5 m deep and the inner one 2.3 m deep, with indications of a bank that once stood between them. The pits in the middle were postholes for timbers that would have been almost 1 m in diameter. The site dates to the Neolithic, with a radiocarbon date of 3650-2650 Cal BC (4440±150) from charcoal from a post-pit. The henge is orientated on the mid-winter sunset, which, when viewed from the henge, sets down the slope of nearby high ground, Chapel Hill.

References

External links

Arminghall Church
Arminghall on Genuki
Arminghall Henge on The Modern Antiquarian
Arminghall Henge on the Megalithic Portal
Arminghall Henge in Virtual Reality
Arminghall Man - poem by Cameron Self

Villages in Norfolk
Archaeological sites in Norfolk
Former civil parishes in Norfolk
South Norfolk